American Family Radio (AFR) is a network of more than 180 radio stations broadcasting Conservative Christian-oriented programming to over 30 states. AFR streams its programming on its website and on the AFR mobile app.

Overview
American Family Radio is split among two networks – AFR Talk, which airs mostly conservative-leaning Christian talk and teaching; and AFR Hybrid, airing Christian talk and contemporary Christian music.

AFR airs original programs such as Today's Issues, hosted by AFA president Tim Wildmon. AFR also airs nationally syndicated programs such as Focus on the Family, as well as contemporary Christian music by various artists. Other personalities heard on AFR include Dr. James Dobson, Dr. Robert Jeffress, David Barton, Jan Markell and Sandy Rios.

History
AFR was launched by Rev. Donald Wildmon in 1991 as a ministry of the American Family Association, with the flagship station being WAFR in Tupelo, Mississippi. It originally aired a contemporary Christian music format. Christian talk and teaching programs were also featured. Eventually, American Family Radio included three networks – Classic Gospel; a Christian AC network; and Inspirational, which included Christian talk and teaching programs. In 2009, American Family Radio launched AFR Talk, and most of its stations joined the new network. The Christian AC network was discontinued at this time. At its peak, American Family Radio was heard on over 200 stations.

Station list

Owned and operated

Affiliates

Former AFR stations

References

External links
American Family Radio website
AFR daily schedule

Christian radio stations in the United States
American Family Radio stations
American radio networks
American Family Association
Radio stations established in 1991
1991 establishments in Mississippi
Organizations that oppose LGBT rights
Radio broadcasting companies of the United States
Conservative media in the United States